The Pimp Tape is the twentieth solo studio album by American rapper Too $hort. It was released on November 9, 2018 through Dangerous Music and EMPIRE. The album features guest appearances from 2 Chainz, Adrian Marcel, Chanel West Coast, DJ Khaled, E-40, French Montana, G-Eazy, Jeremih, Joyner Lucas, Legado 7, Mistah F.A.B., Mozzy, Nef the Pharaoh, Philthy Rich, Richie Rich, Schoolboy Q, Snoop Dogg, T.I., The-Dream, Ty Dolla Sign and YMTK.

Track listing

Chart history

References

2018 albums
Too Short albums
Albums produced by Lil Jon
Albums produced by Zaytoven
Albums produced by Too Short
Albums produced by Drumma Boy
Empire Distribution albums